Port of Call is a 2015 Hong Kong crime thriller film written, edited and directed by Philip Yung and starring Aaron Kwok as a veteran police detective who solving a murder mystery with unusual methods to prove his belief of virtue in human nature. The film is based on a real murder case where a dismembered corpse of a murdered 16-year-old female prostitute was found in Hong Kong in 2008. Port of Call was the closing film at the 39th Hong Kong International Film Festival on 6 April 2015. The film was theatrically released in Hong Kong on 3 December 2015. Port of Call won seven awards at the 35th Hong Kong Film Awards including acting awards Best Actor for Kwok, Best Actress for Jessie Li, Best Supporting Actress for Elaine Jin, Best Supporting Actor and Best New Performer, both for Michael Ning, as well as Best Screenplay and Best Cinematography, while also nominated for six other awards. The film also won many other awards and nominations at the Golden Horse Awards, Hong Kong Film Critics Society Awards and Asian Film Awards. It was selected as the Hong Kong entry  for the Best Foreign Language Film at the 89th Academy Awards but it was not nominated.

Cast
Aaron Kwok as Detective Chong
Elaine Jin as May
Patrick Tam as Smoky
Jessie Li as Wong Kai-mui/Wang Jiamei
Michael Ning as Ting Chi-chung
Jackie Cai as Mo-yung
Maggie Shiu as Superintendent Law
Eddie Chan as Policeman
Hatou Yeung as Flora
Ellen Li as Wang Jiali
Don Li
Ronny Yuen as Hoi
Tam Ping-man as Wong Kai-mui's stepfather
Noel Leung as Seung
Tai Bo as Wong Kai-mui's father
Chan Lai-wan

Production
Filming for Port of Call began in Hong Kong on 1 September 2014 and wrapped up on 26 September. In order to prepare for his role as a grizzled veteran police detective, Aaron Kwok grew a moustache and beard, which, along with his hair, were dyed grey in colour, and also had to reduce his gym exercise routines.

Release
Port of Call premiered as the closing film at the 39th Hong Kong International Film Festival on 6 April 2015 where the 120 minute director's cut version of the film was shown. The film was later theatrically released in Hong Kong on 3 December 2015 with two versions of the film being shown; the 120 minute director's cut version which was rated Category III, along with a 98 minute IIB-rated version.

Awards and nominations

See also
 Aaron Kwok filmography
 List of Hong Kong Category III films
 List of submissions to the 89th Academy Awards for Best Foreign Language Film
 List of Hong Kong submissions for the Academy Award for Best Foreign Language Film

References

External links
 

2015 films
2015 crime thriller films
2010s mystery films
2010s Cantonese-language films
Crime films based on actual events
Films set in Hong Kong
Films shot in Hong Kong
Hong Kong crime thriller films
Fiction about murder
Police detective films
2010s Hong Kong films